The Jordan Brewery Ruins include a complex of limestone buildings built between 1861 and 1900 by brewer Frank Nicolin. It is listed on the National Register of Historic Places in Jordan, Minnesota, United States.

A microbrewery was planned to open in the complex in 2014, but a mudslide triggered by heavy rains damaged the complex and temporarily left its future use in doubt. As of 2021, a medical cannabis dispensary operates in the former brewery.

See also
 List of defunct breweries in the United States

References

External links
 American Breweriana Association - Jordan Brewing

Brewery buildings in the United States
Buildings and structures in Scott County, Minnesota
Defunct brewery companies of the United States
Industrial buildings and structures on the National Register of Historic Places in Minnesota
Ruins in the United States
National Register of Historic Places in Scott County, Minnesota